The Roman Catholic Diocese of Lezhë is a diocese located in the city of Lezhë in the Ecclesiastical province of Shkodër–Pult in Albania.

History
 1400: Established as Diocese of Lezhë

Ordinaries
 Bishops of Lezhë (Roman rite)
 Bishop Ottavio Vitale, R.C.J. (2005.11.23 – Present)
 Bishop Ottavio Vitale, R.C.J. (Apostolic Administrator 2000.02.05 – 2005.11.23)
 Bishop Françesk Gjini (1946.01.04 – 1949)
 Bishop Luigj Bumçi (1911.09.18 – 1943)
 Bishop Leonard Stefan Deda, O.F.M. (1908.04.21 – 1910.10.08)
 Bishop Francesco Malczynski (1870.05.24 – 1908)
 Bishop Paolo Dodmassei (1858.05.02 – ?)
 Archbishop Luigi Ciurcia, O.F.M. (1853.09.27 – 1858.06.04)
 Bishop Gabriele Barissich Bosniese, O.F.M. (1826.09.19 – ?)
 Bishop Nikollë Malci (1797–1826)
 Bishop Mëhill Kryezezi (1786–1797)
 Bishop Gjergj Junki (1765–1786)
 Bishop Anton Kryezezi, O.F.M. (1750–1765)
 Bishop Pal Kampsi (1748–1750)
 Bishop Simon Negri (1739–148)
 Bishop Gjon Gallata (1728–1739)
 Bishop Ludwik Zaluski (1692–1699)
 Bishop Gjergj Vladanji (1656–1692)
 Bishop Benedict Orsini, O.F.M. (1621–1654)
 Bishop Innocent Stoicini, O.S.B. (1596–1620)
 Bishop Marin Braiani, O.F.M. (1578.10.15 – 1596)
 Bishop Fernando Rojas, O. de M. (1519.11.19 – ?)
 Bishop Blasius Vramay, O.P. (1467.06.01 – 1498)
 Bishop Pierre Sarda de Pirano, O.F.M. (1426.11.27 – ?)
 Bishop Andrea Suma (1405–1426)

See also
Roman Catholicism in Albania
List of Roman Catholic dioceses in Albania

Sources
 GCatholic.org
 Catholic Hierarchy

External links

Lezha Online
Lezha Travel & Tourism
 Shengjini Travel & Tourism
Gallery 

Roman Catholic dioceses in Albania
Religious organizations established in the 1400s
1400 establishments in Europe
Roman Catholic dioceses established in the 15th century
Lezhe, Roman Catholic Diocese of